Bora is a tactical ballistic missile developed by Turkish company ROKETSAN. It has 610 mm diameter, a length of 8.0 m, a total weight of 2500 kg with a minimum range of 80 km and maximum range of 280 km. Its export version is called Khan. It was tested and entered service in May 2017. Deliveries were completed in early 2021.

Design
The Bora uses GPS+GLONASS aided  INS / INS only guidance and its launcher is mounted on a VOLAT 8x8 truck. It carries a 470-kg high-explosive or fragmentation warhead. Accuracy is ≤10 m.

Variants
The Bora-2 version with a longer range is under development.

Users

Khan Variant
 : Announced in Indo Defence 2022.

Comparable missiles
J-600T Yıldırım
Hatf-I
Abdali-I
OTR-21 Tochka
9K720 Iskander
P-12
Nasr (missile)
Prahaar (missile)
LORA (missile)
Šumadija (multiple rocket launcher)
Çakır (missile)

References

Bora
Post–Cold War weapons of Turkey
Roketsan products
Surface-to-surface missiles of Turkey
Ballistic missiles of Turkey
Weapons and ammunition introduced in 2017
Theatre ballistic missiles